The Best of MusikLaden Live is a DVD of performances by Ike & Tina Turner on the German television program Musikladen and its predecessor Beat-Club.

Background 
Beat-Club was the first music program on German television that featured international artists. It was co-created by Gerhard Augustin and Mike Leckebusch. In 1972, Beat-Club was renamed Musikladen. Augustin produced Ike & Tina Turner's 1972 album Feel Good. In 1975, Augustin left his position as head of A&R for United Artists Records in Munich to become Ike & Tina Turner's manager.

Critical reception 
Reviewing Best of MusikLaden Live for Billboard (August 14, 1999), Catherine Applefeld Olson wrote: VH1's second-greatest woman in rock (after Aretha Frankin) ignites like a stick of dynamite through eight vintage rockers in this collection of videoclips from the German television show "Musikladen." As part of the Spectacular Soul Revue, Tina was accompanied by husband Ike and several high-energy backup singers and dancers. She electrifies the stage....with performances culled during a period in which Tina's vocals grew stronger and her outfits grew more outrageous. There's not a mediocre selection in the bunch—they're all bona-fide groovin' hits.

Reissues 
The Best of MusikLaden Live was reissued with new packaging from Pioneer Artists in 2002.

Track listing

References 

Live video albums
1999 video albums
1999 live albums
Ike & Tina Turner video albums
Ike & Tina Turner live albums